Vina Vidai Vettai Juniors ( Question, Answer, Hunt) is a 2014 Indian Tamil-language quiz show. It was broadcast on Puthuyugam TV from 16 March 2014 to 15 June 2014. It tests knowledge of Indian culture, sports, politics, history and current affairs. The show was hosted by actress Kasthuri.

The first season saw the top 16 colleges make it to the main show, Indian Institute of Technology Madras and PSG College of Arts and Science as the title winner and runner, followed by Anna University, Guindy in the third place in Vina Vidai Vettai Juniors. The winner and the runner up were awarded cash prizes of Rs. 1,00,000 and Rs. 50,000 respectively.

The Quiz team S. Srinidhi, [X Standard], G.K. Sriram [X], and  R. Balaji [IX] were awarded for the school and the cash prize of Rs.1 lakh.

On the second season of Vina Vidai Vettai juniors was hosted by television star Vijay Adhiraj. The quiz was won by Hariharan S, Siddharth Pillai and Ashwin of Chettinad vidyashram, R.A puram, Chennai. They carried home the winner's trophy and a team cash prize of 75,000 ₹ and one Atlas cycle each.

References

External links
 Puthuyugam TV official website 
 Puthuyugam TV on YouTube
 Vina Vidai Vettai Facebook page

Puthuyugam TV television series
2014 Tamil-language television series debuts
Tamil-language talk shows
Tamil-language quiz shows
Tamil-language television shows
2014 Tamil-language television series endings